Persian embassy to Europe may refer to:

Persian embassy to Europe (1599–1602)
Persian embassy to Europe (1609–1615)